Raymond Wagner (10 November 1921 – 24 September 1997) was a Luxembourgian footballer. He competed in the men's tournament at the 1948 Summer Olympics. He was also President of the Luxembourg Football Federation from 1981 until 1986

References

External links
 

1921 births
1997 deaths
Luxembourgian footballers
Luxembourg international footballers
Olympic footballers of Luxembourg
Footballers at the 1948 Summer Olympics
People from Dudelange
Association football midfielders